Ronald Ouellette is a politician in the province of New Brunswick, Canada.  He was elected to the Legislative Assembly of New Brunswick in 2003 and re-elected in 2006.

Early life
After receiving his Bachelor of Education from the Université de Moncton, he began his teaching career. For many years, he taught special needs children. He held various positions during his 31 years as an educator, including vice-principal at John Caldwell School, and department head at the Polyvalente Thomas-Albert.

His interest in politics began as a teen when he sat on the student council of Collège Saint-Louis/Maillet. He was selected as the New Brunswick representative at the Convention Internationale de la Francophonie in Africa in 1968. From 1984 to 1987, he served as a councillor, before becoming the mayor of Grand Falls (1987 to 1992). He sat on the industrial commission for 11 years, including two years as president. He became president of the urban planning commission in 1999.

Political career
In his first term he represented the electoral district of Grand Falls Region, following which he represented the slightly altered district of Grand Falls-Drummond-Saint-André.

References

Living people
Members of the Executive Council of New Brunswick
New Brunswick Liberal Association MLAs
21st-century Canadian politicians
Université de Moncton alumni
Year of birth missing (living people)